Pioneer Church, also known as the Congregational Church, is a historic church in Cathlamet, Washington. It was built in 1895 and added to the National Register of Historic Places in 1973.

The building is currently used by the Pioneer Community Association.

References

External links

Pioneer Community Association

Churches in Washington (state)
Churches on the National Register of Historic Places in Washington (state)
Churches completed in 1895
Buildings and structures in Wahkiakum County, Washington
National Register of Historic Places in Wahkiakum County, Washington